Takeshi Saito (斎藤 毅 Saitō Takeshi, born 9 September 1961) is a Japanese mathematician, specializing in some areas of number theory and algebraic geometry. His thesis advisor was Kazuya Kato. 

Saito was an invited speaker of the International Congress of Mathematicians in 2010.

Selected publications

Articles

Books

References

1961 births
Living people
20th-century Japanese mathematicians
21st-century Japanese mathematicians
Number theorists
University of Tokyo alumni
Academic staff of the University of Tokyo